Massachusetts Senate's 2nd Suffolk district in the United States is one of 40 legislative districts of the Massachusetts Senate. It covers portions of Suffolk county. Democrat Liz Miranda of Roxbury has represented the district since 2023.

Locales represented
The district includes parts of the city of Boston.

Senators 
 Oliver Frost, circa 1859 
 George F. Monahan
 John I. Fitzgerald
 William J Francis
 Joseph A. Langone, Jr., circa 1935 
 Robert L. Lee, circa 1945 
 Mario Umana, circa 1957-1969 
 Bill Owens, 1975-1983 
 Royal Lee Bolling, Sr.,1983-1989 
 Bill Owens, 1989-1993
 Dianne Wilkerson, 1993-2009 
 Sonia Chang-Díaz, 2009-2023
 Liz Miranda, 2023-current

Images
Portraits of legislators

See also
 List of Massachusetts Senate elections
 List of Massachusetts General Courts
 List of former districts of the Massachusetts Senate
 Suffolk County districts of the Massachusetts House of Representatives: 1st, 2nd, 3rd, 4th, 5th, 6th, 7th, 8th, 9th, 10th, 11th, 12th, 13th, 14th, 15th, 16th, 17th, 18th, 19th

References

External links
 Ballotpedia
  (State Senate district information based on U.S. Census Bureau's American Community Survey).
 
 League of Women Voters of Boston

Senate 
Government of Suffolk County, Massachusetts
Massachusetts Senate